The history of Virginia Commonwealth University began in 1967, when the Medical College of Virginia and the Richmond Professional Institute merged to become one, single university in Richmond, Virginia. The earliest roots of the school trace back to 1838, when the Medical College of Virginia was founded.

Early years

Medical College of Virginia 

The origins of Virginia Commonwealth University begin in 1838, which was when the Medical department of Hampden-Sydney College was founded. By 1844, the Egyptian Building was erected, serving as the main building for the Hampden-Sydney Medical Department. The name "Egyptian Building" was coined due to its Egyptian revival style of architecture. Today, the Egyptian Building is the oldest building at VCU.

While initially serving as a part of Hampden-Sydney, the department received an independent charter from the Virginia General Assembly in 1854 to become its own independent institution of higher learning. Subsequently, the department was rebranded as the Medical College of Virginia. The newly named Medical College (MCV) became a state-funded college in 1860, in return for a $30,000 appropriation. As a public school, the school has its first hospital constructed on campus the following year.

Throughout the American Civil War, the MCV became notable in being one of the few universities in the Confederacy to remain open and have a graduating class each year of the Civil War. The MCV is the only existing school in the Southern United States to have this special distinction. Closing out the 1860s, the school opened its first outpatient clinic.

By 1879, the General Assembly grants the MCV the right to grant students degrees in Pharmacy. In the 1890s, several major additions to the MCV were added, such as the Pharmacy University College in 1893, the School of Dentistry in 1895, and the School of Pharmacy in 1898.

Richmond Professional Institute 

The first steps toward the establishment of a training school for social workers in Richmond, Virginia were taken under the auspices of the Bureau of Vocations for Women, headed by Orie Latham Hatcher. The first planning meeting, chaired by Virginia Spotswood McKenney, was held on October 21, 1916. A board of directors was chosen for the Richmond School of Social Economy by December, and in January 1917 the board decided to open the new school in October with a two-year curriculum. At this time, the school operated out of offices adjoining the office of the Bureau of Vocations.  

In July 1917, Dr. Henry H. Hibbs, Jr. was offered and accepted the directorship of the Richmond School of Social Economy. The school opened on October 11, 1917 with 30 students, all of whom were women. Of the 30 students, 7 were involved in social work and 23 in public health nursing.  The school also became a site for a Red Cross Home Service Institute, training women to lead volunteers in support of families of soldiers and sailors serving in World War I. 

Reverend Scherer secured the first home for the Richmond School of Social Work and Public Health on the third floor of an old brick residence in Capitol Square across from the Governor's mansion at 1112 Capitol Street. At the time nothing suggested a professional school, college, or university in the area and on the building the sign read "Richmond Juvenile and Domestic Relations Court."

In 1920, RPI opened its doors to both men and women, but the first man did not enroll until 1927.

In 1925, the school became the Richmond Division of the College of William and Mary because of $10,000 dollars in support given to RPI each year. In the transition to becoming a public institution from 1925 to 1940, the school was one of the few "state-supported colleges" in the country operating almost entirely without state support. The lack of funding was due mainly to a popular belief that Virginia already had too many public universities and that leaders in Virginia believed the only proper location for a college or university was in a small town and not in an urban environment. With the support from The College of William and Mary, it acquired 827 West Franklin Street (now known as Founder's Hall). The building was purchased for $73,000 and $23,000 was needed for repairs.

When the Great Depression hit and RPI continued to receive no state support, the federal government stepped in to fill the gap. With the help of the Works Progress Administration, many of the buildings were renovated during the depression. In fact, Dr. Hibbs was quoted as saying,

That if it had not been for the WPA, the Richmond Professional Institute would not have amounted to much. In the days before the legislature made appropriations to RPI the WPA enabled us to survive and even grow a little.

In 1939 the school was renamed the Richmond Professional Institute of the College of William and Mary.In 1928, Hibbs hired the Richmond-born Theresa Pollak as the first full-time art instructor. She founded the School of Art, the forerunner to the VCU School of the Arts. There were 8 full-time students the first year and 25 or 30 part-time students.

When RPI became VCU in 1968, the School of the Arts was the largest professional art school in the country, with 1,200 full-time undergraduate students and 75 graduate students.

RPI suffered from having a campus with no new buildings and instead consisted entirely of renovated houses. This in turn hurt RPI's reputation and so in effort to improve the image of RPI, the first new buildings were created in the late 1950s. In 1956, Franklin Street Gym became the first new building constructed on RPI's campus and still stands there today.

In RPI's 1953 pamphlet, An Entirely Different College, Hibbs defined a professional institute as a college or university that arranged most of its programs of study around occupations or professions. Not abiding to the traditional University system, RPI gained a reputation as a unique institution in conservative Virginia. This uniqueness found its way into many of the art and literature students during the 1950s and 1960s as they adopted the beatnik look and dress style. When George Oliver took over as President in 1959, he did not believe that RPI still needed the name recognition that William and Mary brought. This, along with growing radicalism among the students and faculty of RPI began to sever the relationship with the parent school.

Richmond Professional Institute became an independent state university for the first time in 1962 and took on the name Rams.

References 
General

 
 
 

Footnotes

External links

Virginia Commonwealth University
Virginia Commonwealth University